In computational mathematics, the Hadamard ordered fast Walsh–Hadamard transform (FWHTh) is an efficient algorithm to compute the Walsh–Hadamard transform (WHT).  A naive implementation of the WHT of order  would have a computational complexity of O().  The FWHTh requires only  additions or subtractions.

The FWHTh is a divide-and-conquer algorithm that recursively breaks down a WHT of size  into two smaller WHTs of size .   This implementation follows the recursive definition of the  Hadamard matrix :

The  normalization factors for each stage may be grouped together or even omitted.

The sequency-ordered, also known as Walsh-ordered, fast Walsh–Hadamard transform, FWHTw, is obtained by computing the FWHTh as above, and then rearranging the outputs.

Python example code 
def fwht(a) -> None:
    """In-place Fast Walsh–Hadamard Transform of array a."""
    h = 1
    while h < len(a):
        # perform FWHT
        for i in range(0, len(a), h * 2):
            for j in range(i, i + h):
                x = a[j]
                y = a[j + h]
                a[j] = x + y
                a[j + h] = x - y
        # normalize and increment
        a /= 2
        h *= 2

See also 
 Fast Fourier transform

References

External links
 Charles Constantine Gumas, A century old, the fast Hadamard transform proves useful in digital communications

Digital signal processing
Articles with example Python (programming language) code